is a 2014 Japanese horror film based on the video game of the same name. It was released on July 5, 2014 in Japan.

Plot
The movie begins with Anna running around the house avoiding something. She then reaches a room and closes the door as the voice of her brother calls her. The door then opens with the figure of her brother by the gap. The scene then changes back in time to the same boy listening to a guitarist singing on the street. The boy then runs into the road and gets killed in a traffic accident. Anna is then seen placing flowers by the place of the accident a while afterwards, and encounters Shun being bullied by Takuro and his friends.

As the scene goes back to the terrified Anna in the room, it suddenly switches to the time where Anna spends her time with Shun playing the escape game that Shun made by the riverbank. Anna notices the scar in Shun's hand and asks about it, which Shun avoids answering. Anna then heads home as Shun stays a little longer to finish checking his game. Takuro then appears and bullies Shun. Anna is seen looking back as she walks home.

Takuro and Shun walk to an empty house. Upon reaching the house, Mika and Takeshi are already waiting for them. Meanwhile, Hiroshi is collecting a soil sample nearby, then goes to check the house and meet the group. The door suddenly swings open. Takuro enters the house with his stuff, and the rest follow. Anna is seen following them and entering the house as well. As they all enter, the door is locked and cannot be reopened. A smashing noise is heard upstairs and Hiroshi goes up to check by himself.

Except Shun, they all receive unknown calls simultaneously, but no one is speaking. It is shown that the signals are gone. Right afterwards, something seems to pass them in the next room. Takeshi becomes paranoid and starts running around the house to hide. Shun encounters Anna and they move together to find a way out, while Shun points out that he feels that he has seen that something before but can't remember.

Takuro and Mika open the door to the basement, then Takuro goes down, while Mika waits upstairs. Hearing something, Mika checks on the room next door and notices an opening, where she looks directly into a very big eye. Terrified, Mika runs away and is found by Hiroshi. They both check around and find Takeshi hiding in a cupboard. Takeshi mumbles about Naoki's death, but is cut-off by Mika, saying that he will be killed by Takuro as he talks about it again. Takeshi refuses to move, so Hiroshi suggests that he stays there and they will pick him up when they find the way out.

As Hiroshi and Mika go out of the room, they meet up with Anna and Shun. Mika questions Anna's presence, but Hiroshi diverts the questions. They then go together to check around the house. Meanwhile, Takeshi gets a phone call, but no response from the other end. He then hears Takuro calling him from outside the cupboard, so he opens the door as a big blue hand grabs his head. The group hears Takeshi's scream and come back to check on him.

As they reach the room, they see the door open and Takeshi, bleeding, is thrown out. He asks for help before being dragged back, and the door closes. As the group enters the room, they finds Takeshi's dismembered body. Anna and Hiroshi pressure Mika about Takuro's whereabouts and about Naoki, but Mika refuses to tell them and runs away, chased by Hiroshi. Anna confronts Shun who describes that this event is the same as the game he created.

Mika goes back to Takuro and begs him to leave immediately, which he takes lightly. Mika then goes to Takuro and seemingly seduces him just to steal his keys for the house. Takuro ignores her and continues on with his work. Mika rushes to the main door, but the key doesn't seem to work. As she hears noises, she goes to check and encounters the Blue Demon, which then kills Mika.

With Shun's knowledge of the game, they continue on finding the keys and items to move forward inside the house. They eventually reach a room with a blood-stained piano. As they observe the piano, Mika is heard calling Shun through the door. Anna stops him from opening the door, saying that Mika will not call him. Shun is puzzled as the door gets smashed and the Blue Demon is seen. The Blue Demon enters the room, so the two flee. Shun goes to a room with chained drawers locked with number combinations. He manages to grab the handkerchief as the Blue Demon enters from another door. They run away to go back to the piano room. Shun says that they have to use the handkerchief to wipe off the blood for the combinations of a safe.

As they outrun the Blue Demon, Anna is stunned upon seeing the remains of Mika. As they sit and calm themselves, Anna talks about her brother Naoki, the same boy who was killed in a traffic accident, as mentioned in the beginning of the film. The accident was called suicide with the assumption of his inability to withstand bullying. Anna refers to how Shun is similar to her brother. The door then opens as Hiroshi is seen standing on the door. They then go to the piano room, then retrieve the code to get the key to eventually reach the basement.

As they reach the basement, they find that it has been opened by Takuro. As they go down, Takuro strikes Hiroshi, rendering him unconscious. Anna confronts Takuro and believes that Takuro is responsible for killing her brother, which he lightly denies. As Anna begins mentioning Shun's name, he gets annoyed. Puzzled by the conversation, Shun reaches the box Takuro carried and opens it, revealing his own lifeless body inside.

Shun then realizes how the group, except Anna, has been ignoring him the whole time, how Takeshi got so scared when Shun was with him (for Takeshi cannot see Shun), and why Anna said Mika will not call him, because he is already dead and cannot be seen by everyone, except Anna. He then flashbacks to the time Takuro bullied him in the riverbank. Takuro hit Shun in the head, killing him. It is then revealed that Takuro went to the empty house to hide Shun's body. Takuro then explained that Shun used Takuro's name in the game and got mad. Shun is terrified with the truth and finally disappears as Anna apologizes to him.

Takuro plans on killing Anna since she knows too much, but suddenly gets caught by the Blue Demon, and is eaten off-screen. Anna then wakes Hiroshi up, and they both flee. The Blue Demon notices them and chases after them. Hiroshi, knowing that he can't move so easily and will slow Anna down, insists on staying to buy Anna some time to escape. The Blue Demon stomps on him as it chases Anna. Anna finally reaches the same room she was in as in the beginning of the movie, but instead of her brother, Shun is calling her from the door. Anna, confused about what to do next, opens the door into the shining light, where she is greeted by Shun.

The scene goes back to the river, as Shun asks Anna whether she is okay. Shun then explains about the dynamics of the game as Anna notices his scar and holds his hand, telling him to speak whatever troubles him to her, as she can't help her brother and hopes that the same thing will not happen to Shun. Shun replies by holding Anna's hand back, with the screen on the laptop says that they've cleared the game.

Cast
Anna Iriyama as Anna
Kenta Suga as Shun
Seika Furuhata as Mika
Sho Jinnai as Takuro
Seiya as Hiroshi
Riku Ozeki as Takeshi

Sequel
In 2015 another live-action Ao Oni film, Ao Oni ver2.0, was released, although it was not a sequel.  It starred the same six students, but played by different actors.  As well as Ao Oni, this time the film also used the fan favorite character "Blockman" (in the Japanese original, "Fuwatty").

See also
 List of films based on video games

References

External links
  

2014 films
2014 horror films
Live-action films based on video games
Japanese horror films
2010s Japanese films